The Smyrna Trilogy consists of three similar melodies, with the lyrics written in three languages; Judaeo-Spanish, Turkish and Greek. They are all in 9/8 rhythm. One section of each song is combined successively, and given the name, Smyrna Trilogy. These songs were: "En Este Mundo" (In This World), a sorrowful Jewish love song from İzmir; "Oduncular Dağdan Odun İndirir" (The Woodsman Brings Firewood Down The Mountain), a  Turkish love song from Tire, Izmir; and "Υποψία να μην έχεις" (Do not nurture any doubts), a Smyrniote Greek love song from Bayındır, İzmir.

Versions
It was also sung by Melihat Gülses as Sen Nazla Gezerken Güzelim Güller İçinde.

References

Turkish songs
Greek songs
Judaeo-Spanish-language songs
Jewish songs
Jews and Judaism in İzmir
Culture in İzmir
Songwriter unknown
Year of song unknown
Domna Samiou songs